The president of Case Western Reserve University is the principal executive office for Case Western Reserve University, located in Cleveland, Ohio.

Founded in 1826, Western Reserve College appointed its first president in 1830, Rev. Charles Backus Storrs. With its Presbyterian origins, the school's first eight presidents carried the title Reverend. With roots of being located in the old Connecticut Western Reserve, the college held strong influences from Yale College, with four of its first five presidents—Pierce, Hitchcock, Cutler, and Hayden—being Yale alumni.

Founded in 1880, Case School of Applied Science appointed its first president in 1886, Cady Staley.

In 1967, Case Western Reserve University was created through the federation of Case Institute of Technology and Western Reserve University. Robert W. Morse became the first president of the newly combined university.

List of presidents of Western Reserve College/University

List of presidents of Case School of Applied Science / Institute of Technology

List of presidents of Case Western Reserve University

References

Case Western Reserve University
Case Western Reserve University
Case Western Reserve University faculty